The  New York Giants season was the franchise’s 61st season in the National Football League (NFL). The Giants entered the season looking to improve on their 9–7 record in 1984, which was enough to qualify the team for the playoffs as the second wild-card team, and to return to the playoffs for the second consecutive year under third-year head coach Bill Parcells. The Giants managed to do both, finishing with ten victories for the first time since 1963 when the team won eleven games and finishing as the first wild-card team which earned the Giants a home playoff game at Giants Stadium. They defeated the San Francisco 49ers 17–3 in that game, avenging their loss to the 49ers in the previous year's divisional playoffs. However, it was as far as the Giants could get as they were defeated by the eventual Super Bowl champion Chicago Bears in the divisional round at Soldier Field 21–0. Bill Parcells stated in "America's Game: 1986 Giants" about the game the Giants played against the Bears in the playoffs that "an honest evaluation of it, we could have probably beat that team one out of ten times. But that day was one of the days that that could have happened." At the time, the team set a record for most rushing yards in one season by a Giants team.

Offseason

NFL draft

Personnel

Staff

Roster

Regular season
In a game against the Washington Redskins, Joe Theismann's career ended on November 18, 1985, when he suffered a gruesome comminuted compound fracture of his leg while being sacked by New York Giants linebackers Lawrence Taylor and Harry Carson during a Monday Night Football game telecast. The injury was voted the NFL's "Most Shocking Moment in History" by viewers in an ESPN poll, and the tackle was dubbed "The Hit That No One Who Saw It Can Ever Forget" by The Washington Post.

At the time, the Redskins had been attempting to run a "flea-flicker" play. The Giants' defense, however, was not fooled, and they tried to blitz Theismann. Taylor sandwiched Theismann into Carson and inadvertently landed his hip on Theismann's lower right leg, fracturing both the tibia and the fibula.

Schedule

Note: Intra-division opponents are in bold text.

Results

Week 1

Week 2

Week 3

Week 4

Week 5

Week 6

Week 7

Week 8

Week 9

Week 10

Week 11

Week 12

Week 13

Week 14

Week 15

Week 16

Standings

Playoffs

Wild Card

Even though the 49ers recorded 362 yards of total offense, with receiver Dwight Clark catching 8 passes for 120 yards, the Giants limited San Francisco to only one field goal. Meanwhile, New York running back Joe Morris rushed for 141 yards.

Divisional

The Giants lost to the eventual Super Bowl champion Chicago Bears.

Awards and honors
Phil Simms, Pro Bowl MVP

References

External links
 1985 New York Giants at Pro-Football-Reference.com

New York Giants seasons
New York Giants
New York Giants season
20th century in East Rutherford, New Jersey
Meadowlands Sports Complex